Hugh Gower was the member of the Parliament of England for Marlborough for multiple parliament from 1417 to 1422.

References 

Members of Parliament for Marlborough
English MPs 1417
Year of birth unknown
Year of death unknown
English MPs 1420
English MPs May 1421
English MPs December 1421
English MPs 1422